Bill's Legacy is a 1931 British comedy film directed by Harry Revier and starring Leslie Fuller, Mary Clare and Syd Courtenay. It was made at Twickenham Studios as a quota quickie.

Cast
 Leslie Fuller as Bill Smithers  
 Mary Clare as Mrs. Smithers 
 Angela Joyce as Countess  
 Syd Courtenay as Count  
 Ethel Leslie as Bride  
 Ivan Crowe as Groom

References

Bibliography
 Low, Rachael. Filmmaking in 1930s Britain. George Allen & Unwin, 1985.
 Wood, Linda. British Films, 1927-1939. British Film Institute, 1986.

External links

1931 films
British comedy films
1931 comedy films
Films shot at Twickenham Film Studios
Films directed by Harry Revier
Films set in England
Quota quickies
British black-and-white films
1930s English-language films
1930s British films